Inner Landscapes (1987) is a live album by the American ambient musician Robert Rich. It was recorded on March 9, 1985 in Berkeley, California. This album was originally released on cassette in 1987 and was re-edited and released on CD in 1998.

Track listings

Cassette, 1987
”Approach” – 9:24
”Ascent” – 12:07
”Descent Into the First Chamber” – 21:00
”First Chamber” – 11:07
”Second Chamber” – 11:34
”Third Chamber” – 10:21
”Inner Sanctum” – 8:36

Cd, 1998
”Part 1” – 13:22
”Part 2” – 11:20
”Part 3” – 8:14
”Part 4” – 13:25
”Part 5” – 7:09
”Part 6” – 2:21
”Part 7” – 9:21
”Part 8” – 8:43

See also
Robert Rich
Ambient music

References

Robert Rich (musician) albums
Live space music albums
1987 live albums